BMCI ("Morocco Bank of Commerce and Industry") is a bank based in Morocco. It is a majority-owned subsidiary of the French financial group BNP Paribas.

History 

Loans to Morocco, including those of 1902 and 1904 by the Paris and Netherlands Bank, helped finance the First Moroccan Crisis which led to the formation of Morocco as we know it today. However, these loans were at extremely high repayment rates. France, claiming payment guarantees, took control of Morocco's customs duties, which led to its taking control of the country in 1912 as the French protectorate in Morocco.

The bank played a key role as a capital investment bank in developing the Moroccan economy during the first half of the twentieth century. With holdings such as the Compagnie générale du Maroc (Génaroc) and ONA Group, it was actively involved in financing Morocco's infrastructure (roads and railways, electricity, mining, and so on) in partnership with the State Bank of Morocco.

In 1950, Paribas opened a branch in Casablanca. In 1974 this merged with part of Banque Worms in 1974 to form the Société Marocaine de Dépôt et de Crédit ("Morocco Savings and Loan Association", SMDC).

The Banque Nationale pour le Commerce et l'Industrie en Afrique ("National Bank for Trade and Industry in Africa", BNCIA) had also been developing interests in Morocco since 1941. developed its activities Morocco from 1940.

Marocaine pour le Commerce et l'Industrie was created in 1964 from these origins, as part of the nationalization of Moroccanization businesses.

In 2000, itself created in 1966 by the merger of the CNEP and BNCI, merged with Paribas to form BNP Paribas. In November 2001, Marocaine pour le Commerce et l'Industrie acquired its dormant ABN Amro Bank Maroc arm, to consolidate its position in the Morocco financial services market.

Ownership 
 , BNP Paribas is the majority shareholder, with 65.03% of stock.
 The remaining stock is divided between:
 AXA Assurance Maroc (9.11%)
 Sanad Assurance (5.84%)
 Atlanta Assurance (4.44%)
 Holmarcom (2.41%)
 Others: 13.17%

Subsidiaries 
 Arval
 BMCI Bourse
 BMCI Finance
 BMCI Leasing Auto
 BMCI Gestion
 BMCI Assurance
 BMCI Crédit Conso
 BMCI Banque Offshore

References

External links

 
 

Banks of Morocco
BNP Paribas
Companies based in Casablanca